HSP may refer to:

Biology, chemistry, and medicine 
Hansen solubility parameters
Heat shock protein
Henoch–Schönlein purpura
Hereditary spastic paraplegia
Highly sensitive person, with high  sensory processing sensitivity

Mathematics, software, and technology 
Hidden subgroup problem, in mathematics
High Speed Photometer, Hubble Space Telescope instrument
Host signal processing, software emulating hardware
Hot Soup Processor, a programming language
High-Scoring Segment Pair, in the BLAST algorithm
List of Bluetooth profiles#Headset Profile (HSP)

Education 
Harvard Sussex Program, an inter-university collaboration
Holy Spirit Preparatory School, in Atlanta, Georgia, United States

Political parties 
 Croatian Party of Rights
 People's Voice Party, Turkey

Other uses 
Halal snack pack, an Australian dish